Ximena Rubio is a Mexican film and television actress. She was born in Mexico City on December 2, 1978, granddaughter of famous Mexican film director Servando González, the first Mexican to direct a film in Hollywood and sister to director Pedro González Rubio.

Training
Ximena González Rubio studied classical ballet from the age of six. In her teens, she decided to study acting, training with Luwick Margules and José Luís Ibáñez, of the Actoral Training Centre (CEFAC) of TV Azteca in Mexico. Ximena Rubio's father was architecture and mother was lawyer. In 2007, she traveled to New York City to continue training at The Actors Studio, but decided to end her studies when she received the offer to star in the telenovela "Contrato de Amor"

Telenovelas and movies

Telenovelas
2011: El 8º Mandamiento" ... Sofia
2010: Stars in "Las Aparicio" with Liz Gallardo, Gabriela de la Garza and Maria del Carmen Farías
2008: Stars in "Contrato de Amor
2004: "Al Filo de la Ley", "Gitanas"
2002: " Daniela"
2001: "Lo que callamos las mujeres".
2000: "Golpe Bajo" y "Hablama de Amor"
1999: "Háblame de Amor", "Besos prohibidos"
1998: "Señora", "Azul Tequila"

Movies
2003: Maravillas
2007: El viaje de la nona

See also
Las Aparicio

References

External links
 Clip Ximena Rubio
 Celebrities
 Official Blog Las Aparicio
 Ximena González Rubio Biography

1978 births
Living people
Mexican film actresses
Mexican telenovela actresses